For information on all Texas A&M University–Commerce sports, see Texas A&M–Commerce Lions
The Texas A&M–Commerce Lions softball team is the intercollegiate softball program representing Texas A&M University–Commerce. The school competes in the Southland Conference in Division I of the National Collegiate Athletic Association (NCAA). For their first eight years of existence, they competed  in the Lone Star Conference (LSC) in Division II. The A&M–Commerce softball team plays its home games at John Cain Family Softball Complex on the university campus in Commerce, Texas. The team is currently coached by Brittany Miller.

History 

Softball has been a varsity sport at A&M–Commerce since the 2015 season. The program was first announced in May 2013, making it both the seventh women's sport to be offered by the university and making A&M–Commerce the last school in the LSC to sponsor softball. According to then-athletic director Ryan Ivey, the university's decision to add softball was due to its rising popularity and the growing talent pool of players in Northeast Texas, as well as to help A&M–Commerce meet Title IX requirements.

From 2015 to 2021, the team was coached by Richie Bruister, previously the head softball coach at Henderson State University and Texas Woman's University. Bruister compiled a record of 183–97, four LSC Championship appearances, and three NCAA tournament appearances in five years with TWU; he also won both the LSC and National Fastpitch Coaches Association Coach of the Year awards in 2013.

In its inaugural 2015 season, the Lions achieved an overall record of 29–24, finishing sixth in the regular-season LSC standings and reaching the quarterfinals of the conference tournament before being eliminated. Other achievements during the program's first season included Tyler Oppenheim's recognition as an LSC Player of the Week and the team's average GPA of 3.536, the highest in the conference. Also in 2015, the A&M–Commerce softball team hosted the inaugural Lion Classic, a four-team tournament that included Northeastern State University, Southern Nazarene University, and Tarleton State University.

After seven seasons, Bruister left A&M-Commerce, having compiled an overall record of 231-114. His associate head coach, Gay McNutt, was subsequently promoted to interim head coach. In their final season in the Lone Star Conference before moving up to Division I, McNutt guided the Lions to their first and only Lone Star Conference Tournament victory before eventually falling in the Regional Tournament against the Texas A&M-Kingsville Javelinas.

Following the season, McNutt resigned to take over the head coaching position at Texas Woman's University on June 9, 2022. On June 24, 2022, Brittany Miller was hired as the third head coach in program history.

On August 3, 2022, Miller added three-time Olympic gold medalist Crystl Bustos to the coaching staff as an assistant coach.

All-time record 

Year-by-year results through the end of the 2022 season

Stadium 

The Lions softball team has played at John Cain Family Softball Complex since its first game, on February 1, 2015, against St. Edward's University. The stadium seats 800 spectators in both general admission and reserved seating, not including its extra capacity for standing-room-only spectators and those watching the game from the center-field picnic berm. The playing surface is artificial turf, featuring an atypically blue-colored infield and a large A&M–Commerce lion logo in center field. John Cain Family Softball Field also features home and visitor in-ground dugouts, bullpens for both teams, and three batting cages. As of October 2015, the softball program is raising funds to add an indoor batting facility on the grounds of the stadium.

2019 and 2021 NCAA Division II South Central Regional tournament games were held at the stadium.

References

External links